Rostov Nuclear Power Plant ( []), also known as Volgodonsk Nuclear Power Plant ( []), is a Russian nuclear power plant located on the left bank of the Tsimlyansk reservoir in the lower stream of the Don River near Volgodonsk, Rostov Oblast.

Construction of Rostov reactor No. 1 began in 1977 and operations began in 2001. Construction of reactor No. 2 commenced in 1983 and finished in 2010. Unit 3 was connected to the electrical grid for the first time in December 2015. Unit 4 underwent first criticality on 7 December 2017, and put into commercial operation on 28 September 2018. Units No. 3 and 4 are of an upgraded VVER-1000/320 subtype.

The post-Soviet Union revival of the nuclear industry of Russia took place at Rostov in the early 2000s, with the completion of the building of unit 2 in 2010, unit 3 in 2015 and unit 4 in 2017. Unit 4 was the last VVER-1000/V-320 reactor built.

Reactors

Incidents 
On 21 October, 2021, Unit Two at the Rostov Nuclear Power Plant activated emergency shutdown procedures. and put on maintenance mode, because of a steam leak.
On 31 December 2022 A fire broke out at a substation killing one person.

See also

 Nuclear power in Russia

References 

Nuclear power stations in Russia
Nuclear power stations using VVER reactors